Farlin is an unincorporated community in Greene County, Iowa, United States.

History 
Farlin was founded in the 1880s. Farlin is the name of one Mr. McFarlin, an early prominent grain buyer. Farlin's population was 45 in 1902.

References 

Unincorporated communities in Iowa
Unincorporated communities in Greene County, Iowa
1880s establishments in Iowa